Sidekiq is an open source job scheduler written in Ruby. Sidekiq by default doesn't do scheduling, it only executes jobs. The Enterprise version comes with scheduling out of the box.

Architecture
Sidekiq uses Redis as an in-memory data structure store and is written in Ruby. It also supports Java clients. It can be used with Resque, another Redis based job scheduler, or more commonly as a standalone product.

Sidekiq reads jobs from a Redis queue, using the First In First Out (FIFO) model, to process jobs. Job processing is asynchronous, allowing a web-serving thread to continue serving new requests rather than be blocked processing slower tasks.

Reception and use
Sidekiq is described as a “well-known queue processing software”.

It's used by Ruby applications needing to run tasks in the background, and not in the web requests handling time, like Mastodon, Diaspora, GitLab and Discourse. Sidekiq is also used to submit threads to the PHASTER phage search tool.

References

Message-oriented middleware
Free software programmed in Ruby